A meteor or "shooting star" is the visible streak of light from a heated and glowing object falling through the Earth's atmosphere.
 A meteoroid is a small rocky or metallic body travelling through outer space.
 A meteorite is a solid piece of debris from such a body which survives its passage through the Earth's atmosphere, and falls to the Earth's surface.

Meteor may also refer to:

Astronomy and space exploration
 Meteor (rocket), a Polish meteorology rocket (1963–1974)
 Meteor (satellite), three series of weather satellites of the Soviet Union, starting in 1969
 Meteor, a spacecraft recovery system being developed by the student-run Cambridge University society CU Spaceflight

Geography
 Meteor, Wisconsin, a town in the United States
 Meteor (community), Wisconsin, an unincorporated community, United States
 Meteor Crater, Arizona, United States
 Great Meteor Seamount, Portugal

Science and technology
 Meteor (weather), any weather phenomenon, as studied in meteorology
 Meteor (web framework), an open-source JavaScript web application development platform
 METeOR, an Australian information repository
 Meteor goldfish, a variety of goldfish having no tail fin
 METEOR (Metric for Evaluation of Translation with Explicit ORdering), a metric for the evaluation of machine translation output

Business
 Meteor (mobile network), a defunct mobile phone operator in Ireland
 Meteor Vineyard, a vineyard in Napa Valley

Transport
 Météor, a codename for the Paris Métro Line 14
 Meteor (automobile), a brand of car from Ford Motor Company of Canada (1949–1976)
 Ford Meteor, a car model, available 1981–1995
 Mercury Meteor, a car in North America, 1961–1963
 Volkswagen Meteor, a modified version of the MAN TGX made by Volkswagen Caminhões e Ônibus
 Meteor (St. Louis-San Francisco Railway), a named passenger train
 Silver Meteor, an Amtrak train service
 Meteor, a South Devon Railway Comet class 4-4-0ST steam locomotive
 Meteor (1986), a German research vessel
 Meteor (1915), a German survey vessel
 Meteor, German Kaiser Wilhelm II's yacht, the former Thistle, which was sold in 1895 to the German Navy to be used as a school yacht and renamed Comet
 , several U.S. Navy ships
 , several ships of the Royal Navy
 , several ships of the Imperial German Navy
 , several steamships

Arts and entertainment
 Meteor Music Awards, Ireland's national music awards, also known as "The Meteors"
 Meteor (film), a 1979 science-fiction film
 Meteor (miniseries), a 2009 disaster-science fiction two-part TV mini-series starring Billy Campbell and Marla Sokoloff
 Meteor Records, an American record label
 The Meteors, English psychobilly band formed in 1980
 "Meteor" (Pink Lady song), 2019
 "Meteor", song by Changmo
 Kamen Rider Meteor, a fictional character in the Japanese television series Kamen Rider Fourze
 Meteor, a powerful magic spell in the video game Final Fantasy VII
 Meteor, a 1929 play by S. N. Behrman
 Meteor, a science fiction short story by John Wyndham in the collection The Seeds of Time
 Meteor (horse), a racing horse
 Meteor (juggling), a juggling prop

Weaponry
 The Meteor hammer, a Chinese martial arts weapon or dance prop
 Gloster Meteor, the first British jet fighter and the Allies' first operational jet (1943–1970s)
 Rolls-Royce Meteor, a tank engine version of the Rolls-Royce Merlin
 MBDA Meteor, a next-generation beyond visual range air-to-air missile
 BSA Meteor Air Rifle, a Birmingham Small Arms Company-manufactured air rifle

See also
Meteorite (disambiguation)
Meteorology, the interdisciplinary scientific study of the atmosphere
Meteora (disambiguation)